Aigars Jansons (born 27 July 1971) is a Latvian wrestler. He competed in the men's Greco-Roman 57 kg at the 1996 Summer Olympics.

References

External links
 

1971 births
Living people
Latvian male sport wrestlers
Olympic wrestlers of Latvia
Wrestlers at the 1996 Summer Olympics
People from Sigulda